Paul Thomas Haenle (born ) is an American political adviser, and an international relations professor and consultant.

Career
Paul Haenle holds the Maurice R. Greenberg Director’s Chair at the Carnegie-Tsinghua Center for Global Policy (CTC) in Beijing, China. He established CTC, the Beijing-based think tank of the Carnegie Endowment for International Peace, at Tsinghua University in 2010. In 2018, CTC was named the “Best International Global Affairs Think Tank” by Prospect Magazine. 

In addition to his role at Carnegie, Haenle is also Chairman, Asia Pacific Region, at the CEO advisory firm Teneo and a senior advisor at Rice, Hadley, Gates & Manuel LLC, where he assists U.S. and foreign businesses with their cross-border business strategy, including the development of key government relationships, crisis management, and public relations. Haenle also serves as senior advisor to SAGE Worldwide, a global events and speaker company; the Royal Asiatic Society, Beijing Chapter; and the Young China Watchers, a global platform for facilitating dialogue between international and Chinese young professionals. He is also an adjunct professor at Tsinghua University, where he teaches undergraduate and graduate-level courses on international relations and global governance. In 2018, Haenle was elected to the board of directors of the National Committee on U.S.-China Relations.

Prior to joining Carnegie, Haenle served as the White House China director on the National Security Council under former Presidents George W. Bush and Barack Obama. He was also the White House representative to the U.S. negotiating team at the Six-Party Talks from June 2007 to January 2009. During his distinguished government service, Haenle served as special assistant to U.S. National Security Advisors Condoleezza Rice and Stephen Hadley from 2004 to 2007, and in the Pentagon as a China advisor for the chairman of the Joint Chiefs of Staff.

Haenle is an expert on U.S.-China relations, China’s foreign and defense policy, and North Korea. He hosts CTC's biweekly "China in the World" podcast, which features a series of conversations with Chinese and international experts on China’s foreign policy, China’s international role, and China’s relations with the world. Since the first episode in 2013, the podcast has been downloaded over a million times from over 125 countries.  Haenle also writes for and is frequently quoted by major global media outlets including Foreign Affairs, The New York Times, Washington Post, CNN, The Guardian, and the Financial Times. He is also a frequent contributor to the Asia Society’s ChinaFile.

Trained as a China foreign area officer in the U.S. Army, Haenle was twice assigned to the U.S. Embassy in Beijing. He served as a U.S. Army company commander during a two-year tour to the Republic of Korea. Early assignments in the U.S. Army included postings in Germany, Desert Storm, Korea, and Kuwait. He retired from active duty as a lieutenant colonel in October 2009.

Haenle received an M.A in Asian studies from Harvard University, and a B.S. from Clarkson University.

Published works
 "China isn't riding to rescue the Australian economy" (Financial Review, June 2020)
 "Can the United States and China Cooperate on the Coronavirus?" (China-US Focus, February 2020)
 "The United States and China See Things Differently. Can They Reach an Understanding?" (Carnegie-Tsinghua Center, December 2019)
 "Hong Kong: Continued Unrest with No Clear Path to a Resolution"  (Teneo, December 2019)
 "U.S.-China Trade War, Light at the End of the Tunnel?"  (Teneo, November 2019)
 "Chaos in Hong Kong: Protests and Unrest Persist"  (Teneo, October 2019)
 "Trump Is Beijing’s Best Asset"  (Foreign Policy, October 2019)
 "How Has the U.S.-China Relationship Changed Over Seventy Years?"  (Carnegie-Tsinghua Center, September 2019)
 "What Exactly Is the Story with China’s Rare Earths?"  (Chinafile, May 2019)
 "How Are Various Countries Responding to China’s Belt and Road Initiative?"  (Carnegie-Tsinghua Center, April 2019)
 "Is This the End of Belt and Road, or Just the Beginning?"  (Chinafile, April 2019)
 "The Belt and Road Initiative: Views from Washington, Moscow, and Beijing"  (Carnegie-Tsinghua Center, April 2019)
 "What Will Happen at the Second Trump-Kim Nuclear Summit?"  (Carnegie-Tsinghua Center, February 2019)
 "Global Trade Outlook"  (Teneo, February 2019)
 "A Tale of Two Cities: Singapore and Hanoi"  (The Geopolitics, February 2019)
 "U.S.-China Relations at the Forty-Year Mark"  (Carnegie-Tsinghua Center, January 2019)
 "Tempering Expectations Ahead of the G20"  (Caixin, November 2018)
 "China’s Deleveraging Overshadows Trade War"  (Teneo, November 2018)
 "On Secretary of State Pompeo’s Upcoming North Korea Visit"  (China Review News Agency, July 2018). Translated version here. 
 "Foreign Policy Experts on the Singapore Summit and What Comes Next"  (Carnegie-Tsinghua Center, June 2018)
 "Mapping Regional Agendas for the Singapore Summit"  (Carnegie-Tsinghua Center, June 2018)
 "More than a Belt, More than a Road"  (SuperReturn365, April 2018)
 "Does China Want the Koreas to Reconcile?"  (Chinafile, April 2018)
 "China Seizes the Initiative in Complicated North Korea Diplomacy"  (China-US Focus, April 2018)
 "China: Trade Tensions, Talks with North Korea and Term Limits"  (Teneo, April 2018)
 "China’s Future Under Xi Jinping"  (Teneo, November 2017)
 "Trump’s Wake-Up Call on China"  (Carnegie-Tsinghua Center, November 2017)
 "What Will a Powerful Xi Mean For the China-U.S. Relationship?"  (CNN, October 2017)
 "China and the World After the 19th Party Congress"  (Carnegie-Tsinghua Center, October 2017)
 "New Reformists Emerging in China"  (Teneo, October 2017)
 "Bannon Says the U.S. Is at ‘Economic War with China’"  (Chinafile, September 2017)
 "U.S. and Chinese Scholars Take on the U.S.-China Economic Dialogue"  (Carnegie-Tsinghua Center, July 2017)
 "Trump and Xi at G20 in Hamburg: Time to Abandon Illusions"  (CNN, July 2017)
 "The World Is Deserting Taiwan. How Should the U.S. Respond?"  (Carnegie-Tsinghua Center, June 2017)
 "Shanghai Cooperation Organization at Crossroads: Views From Moscow, Beijing and New Delhi"  (Carnegie-Moscow Center, June 2017)
 "Xi’s Vision for China’s Belt and Road Initiative"  (Carnegie-Tsinghua Center, May 2017)
 "The Mirage of the Deal: Trump’s Grand Bargains with Russia and China"  (China-US Focus, April 2017)
 "Don’t Call it the New Chinese Global Order (Yet)"  (Foreign Policy, March 2017).
 "Is the Trump Era Really the Xi Era?"  (Chinafile, February 2017)
 "How Trump’s Call With Taiwan Could Affect U.S. Goals in Asia"  (New York Times, December 2016)
 "The Next U.S. President and Beyond"  (China Daily, November 2016)
 "How Should Trump Deal With China, and How Should China Deal With Trump?"  (Chinafile, November 2016)
 "Will Trump Strike a Grand Bargain With China?"  (Foreign Policy, November 2016)
 "The Real Answer to China’s THAAD Dilemma"  (The Diplomat, September 2016)
 "New Realities in the U.S.-China Relationship"  (China-US Focus, September 2015)
 "Mounting Difficulties For Doing Business in Xi Jinping’s China"  (Teneo, September 2015)
 "The Catch-22 in U.S.-Chinese Relations"  (Foreign Affairs, February 2015)
 "A Reference Point for Internationalizing Chinese Think Tanks"  (China.org, February 2015) Translated version here. 
 "The World in 2015"  (Carnegie Endowment for International Peace, late 2014)
 "China Flexes Diplomatic Muscles to Match Growing Economic Size"  (Insight, December 2014)
 "Building Strategic Trust in the U.S.-China Relationship"  (National Bureau of Asian Research, November 2014)
 "North Korea’s Charm Offensive: New Cards, Same Player"  (The Diplomat, October 2014)
 "Moving Beyond China’s Confident Rhetoric on Syria"  (Carnegie-Tsinghua Center, June 2014)
 "U.S.-China Relations: Moving Beyond the Script"  (China International Strategy Review, April 2014).
 "Baucus Can Bring China to Congress"  (Carnegie-Tsinghua Center, February 2014)
 "What Does a New Type of Great-Power Relations Mean for the United States and China?"  (Phoenix Weekly, January 2014)
 "Charm Offensive At Sea"  (Carnegie-Tsinghua Center, January 2014)
 "Time to Reopen Talks With North Korea?"  (Carnegie-Tsinghua Center, October 2013)
 "China Misses a Golden Opportunity in Syria"  (Financial Times Chinese, October 2013) Translated version here. 
 "Xi and Abe Need to Talk"  (Carnegie-Tsinghua Center, September 2013)
 "North Korea is China’s Problem Now"  (CNN, June 2013)
 "Moving Beyond the Script at the U.S.-China Summit"  (Carnegie-Tsinghua Center, June 2013)
 "The Middle East at the U.S.-China Summit"  (Washington Institute for Near East Policy, June 2013)
 "North Korea’s Defiance May Reshape China’s Strategic Calculus"  (World Politics Review, February 2013)
 "Sino-U.S. Ties Need New Approach"  (China Daily, December 2012)
 "A New Great-Power Relationship With Beijing"  (Carnegie Endowment Global Ten, November 2012)
 "The China Factor in the U.S. Presidential Election: Separating Rhetoric from Action"  (Carnegie-Tsinghua Center, October 2012)
 "Overcoming Mistrust in U.S.-China Relations"  (Carnegie-Tsinghua Center, January 2011).

References

Living people
American foreign policy writers
American male non-fiction writers
United States Army officers
Harvard Graduate School of Arts and Sciences alumni
1966 births
Carnegie Endowment for International Peace
Clarkson University alumni